Jodie McMullen (born 15 February 1974) is a former Miss Australia in 1996. During the international beauty pageant, she did not make the top 10 but won the Miss Congeniality award. Later she became an actress, model and television presenter, making her UK TV debut in 2007 with a role in the TV series Honest. She has worked as a freelance writer for several online and print magazines.

References

External links
Official website for Jodie McMullen

1974 births
Australian beauty pageant winners
Living people
Miss Universe 1996 contestants